Cattleya schroederae is a species of orchid. C. schroederae is named after Baroness Schroeder, wife of  Sir John Schroder, see :de:John Henry Schröder. It is a Colombian unifoliate Cattleya species. Flowers are to 9" (22.5 cm) across, strongly fragrant. C. shroederae blooms in spring from a sheath that has formed before the winter dormancy. As it blooms around Easter in Northern hemisphere, it is often referred to as "Easter orchid", a name it shares with Cattleya mossiae.

References

External links 

schroederae
schroederae